Pericalymma crassipes is a plant species of the family Myrtaceae endemic to Western Australia.

It blooms between September and November producing white-green-pink flowers.

It is found in swamps and on seasonally wet flats in the South West and Great Southern regions of Western Australia where it grows in peaty sand to clay soils.

References

crassipes
Flora of Western Australia
Plants described in 1844